FC Sparta Sollentuna is a Swedish football club located in the Stockholm suburb of Sollentuna.

Background
Since their foundation, FC Sparta Sollentuna has participated mainly in the lower divisions of the Swedish football league system.  The club currently plays in Division 6 A Stockholm, which is the eight tier of Swedish football. They play their home matches at the Edsbergs Sportfalt in Sollentuna.

In January 2011, the club reached their first title success when they lifted the Gaz Cup 2011 in Bosön after a 3–0 win in the final against Kransen United.

In September 2011, with four games left to be played, they secured promotion to the sixth division after a 3–1 victory away to Alianza IF, thus becoming league winners during their first year of participation. They ended their division 7 campaign with 12 wins and 2 draws, making them the only undefeated team in the whole district of Stockholm.

During their first season in division 6 they crashed in the bottom of the table maintaining only 4 points until the summer break. Their second part of the season was more successful gaining additional 11 points but they fell short of gaining a renewed contract and were relegated down to division 7 despite beating Sollentuna United and Sollentuna Fotboll in the pre-season games. Their newly formed reserve team meanwhile, went on and won their R4A division and were promoted to the R3A for 2013.

In the upcoming season of 2013 FC Sparta will compete in the 7B division of the Stockholm division of Swedish football.
FC Sparta Sollentuna are affiliated with the Stockholms Fotbollförbund.

Current squad 
As of 12 August 2012

For season transfers, see transfers winter 2011–2012.

External links 
 FC Sparta – Official Website

Footnotes

Football clubs in Stockholm